The 1965–66 Auburn Tigers men's basketball team represented Auburn University in the 1965–66 college basketball season. The team's head coach was Bill Lynn, who was in his third season at Auburn. The team played their home games at Auburn Sports Arena in Auburn, Alabama. They finished the season 16–10, 8–8 in SEC play.

References

Auburn Tigers men's basketball seasons
Auburn
Auburn Tigers
Auburn Tigers